Barry C. Burden (born April 28, 1971) is an American political scientist. He is Professor of Political Science at the University of Wisconsin–Madison, where he is also the Lyons Family Chair in Electoral Politics and director of the Elections Research Center. Before joining the faculty of the University of Wisconsin–Madison in 2006, he taught at Louisiana State University and Harvard University.

References

External links
Faculty page

Living people
1971 births
University of Wisconsin–Madison faculty
Wittenberg University alumni
Ohio State University Graduate School alumni
American political scientists
Louisiana State University faculty
Harvard University faculty